Cazangic is a commune in Leova District, Moldova. It is composed of three villages: Cazangic, Frumușica and Seliște.

Notable people
 Valeriu Matei 
 Iurie Matei

References

Communes of Leova District